Christopher Robert Margules (AM) is the Leader of the Indo-Pacific Field Division of Conservation International. He is based in Queensland, Australia and has written extensively on the management of biological diversity and biological diversity planning.

References

Living people
Australian environmentalists
Members of the Order of Australia
Year of birth missing (living people)